Leeds/Bradford MCC University, formerly Leeds/Bradford University Centre of Cricketing Excellence, was formed in 2005, and first appeared in first-class cricket in 2012. The players in this list have all played at least one first-class match for Leeds/Bradford MCCU.

Players are listed in order of appearance, where players made their debut in the same match, they are ordered by batting order.

Key

List of players

References

Leeds Bradford MCCU
Student cricket in the United Kingdom